"Hologram World" is a song by the Tiny Masters of Today. The single features the song "Hologram World", the XFM version of "Hologram World" and the music video for "Radio Riot" directed by Nick Chatfield-Taylor. It was released in the United Kingdom on February 25, 2008. Alternate versions of the single feature the XFM version of "Hey, Mr. DJ".

Music video
Under the moniker Kids with Canes, Karen O and her boyfriend Barney Clay directed the music video for the song "Hologram World" which was released on February 8, 2008. Karen also served as choreographer and appears in the video along with Yeah Yeah Yeahs bandmates Nick Zinner and Brian Chase as well as Mike D from the Beastie Boys, Gibby Haynes from the Butthole Surfers, Russell Simins from the Blues Explosion and Sam  James from The Mooney Suzuki.

Track listing 
 "Hologram World"
 "Hologram World" (XFM Version)
 "Radio Riot" (video)

Personnel 
 Ivan: vocals, guitar
 Ada: vocals, bass guitar, keyboards and percussion
 Russell Simins: drums
 Karen O: vocals
 Nick Zinner: guitar

References

2008 singles
2008 songs
Tiny Masters of Today songs
Mute Records singles